Keymer  is a village in Hassocks civil parish, in the Mid Sussex District of West Sussex, England.

Keymer was an ancient parish that like its near neighbour Clayton was merged into the modern day parish of Hassocks. Both Keymer and Clayton's records go back as far as the Domesday Book. Keymer is situated just to the east of Hassocks and is only a matter of a few hundred yards from the boundary with East Sussex. It has a fine parish church, St Cosmas and St Damian Church. The oldest part of Keymer can be found in the area of this church and the Greyhound public house. Several buildings in this area are listed as being of special architectural or historic interest and the oldest dates from the 15th century. To the north-east of Keymer can be found Oldland Mill dating from the 18th century. It is one of the few remaining post mills still standing in the South East. The new burial ground that is now run by Hassocks Parish Council can be found located to the east of the Greyhound pub.

References

External links

Villages in West Sussex
Mid Sussex District